How to be Loved is a Polish film released in 1963, directed by Wojciech Has.

The film, based on a novel of the same name by Kazimierz Brandys, examines the emotional casualties of war, which is perhaps the central theme of the Polish Film School. On a deeper level, the film manages to construct a personal tragedy that results from a struggle of egoism and cowardice versus devotion and courage. 

On a plane bound for Paris, Felicja (Barbara Krafftówna), a successful radio actress, recalls the night in 1939 when she was to debut as Ophelia, with the man she loved, Wiktor (Zbigniew Cybulski), playing Hamlet. World War II intervenes, and Felicja takes a job as a waitress to avoid acting on a German stage, giving her lover sanctuary when he's accused of killing a collaborator. After the war, Wiktor can't get away fast enough, hot on the trail of fame and applause, and the woman who saved him is herself wrongly accused of collaboration. Years later, Wiktor and Felicja meet again, and the tables have turned.

The film was entered into the 1963 Cannes Film Festival.

Cast
 Barbara Krafftówna as Felicja
 Zbigniew Cybulski as Wiktor Rawicz
 Artur Młodnicki as Tomasz
 Wieńczysław Gliński as bacteriologist
 Wiesław Gołas as German soldier
 Wiesława Kwaśniewska as photographer
 Zdzisław Maklakiewicz as journalist Zenon
 Tadeusz Kalinowski - Peters
 Mirosława Krajewska as flight attendant

See also 
Cinema of Poland
List of Polish language films

References

External links

1963 films
Polish war films
Films directed by Wojciech Has
1960s Polish-language films
Polish World War II films
Polish black-and-white films
1963 war films